"Turning Up the Radio" is a song by the American rock band Weezer from their studio album Death to False Metal. Its genesis came about in 2008 when Weezer frontman Rivers Cuomo used YouTube to source ideas for creating a song using video submissions from other users of the platform.
The base track was recorded in 2008 by Taylor Morden, the completed demo was presented to Jacknife Lee later that year, but it was ultimately polished by Cuomo and Shawn Everett for Death to False Metal in 2010.

Reception

Michael Roffman of Consequence of Sound said that the song resulted in "a dynamite track that recalls Thin Lizzy. It’s catchy and will likely swim in your playlist for awhile." Fraser McAlpine writing for BBC Music indicated it would sate the desires of fans of "classic power-pop", marking it as a rock song that is "loud and dumb, but also snarky and smart"

Personnel

Lead vocals
 Rivers Cuomo
Instrumental
 Taylor Morden
Mixing
 Marc McClusky
Additional production
 Shawn Everett

References

2010 songs
Weezer songs
Songs written by Rivers Cuomo